A plantation complex in the Southern United States is the built environment (or complex) that was common on agricultural plantations in the American South from the 17th into the 20th century. The complex included everything from the main residence down to the pens for livestock. Until the abolition of slavery, such plantations were generally self-sufficient settlements that relied on the forced labor of enslaved people.

Plantations are an important aspect of the history of the Southern United States, particularly the Antebellum era (pre-American Civil War). The mild temperate climate, plentiful rainfall, and fertile soils of the Southeastern United States allowed the flourishing of large plantations, where large numbers of enslaved Africans or African Americans were held captive and forced to produce crops to create wealth for a white elite.

Today, as was also true in the past, there is a wide range of opinion as to what differentiated a plantation from a farm. Typically, the focus of a farm was subsistence agriculture. In contrast, the primary focus of a plantation was the production of cash crops, with enough staple food crops produced to feed the population of the estate and the livestock. A common definition of what constituted a plantation is that it typically had  or more of land and produced one or two cash crops for sale. Other scholars have attempted to define it by the number of enslaved persons.

The plantation complex

The vast majority of plantations did not have grand mansions centered on a huge acreage.  These large estates did exist, but represented only a small percentage of the plantations that once existed in the South.  Although many Southern farmers did enslave people before emancipation in 1862, few enslaved more than five. These farmers tended to work the fields alongside the people they enslaved. Of the estimated 46,200 plantations existing in 1860, 20,700 had 20 to 30 enslaved people and 2,300 had a workforce of a hundred or more, with the rest somewhere in between.

Many plantations were operated by absentee-landowners and never had a main house on site. Just as vital and arguably more important to the complex were the many structures built for the processing and storage of crops, food preparation and storage, sheltering equipment and animals, and various other domestic and agricultural purposes. The value of the plantation came from its land and the enslaved people who toiled on it to produce crops for sale. These same people produced the built environment: the main house for the plantation owner, the slave cabins, barns, and other structures of the complex.

The materials for a plantation's buildings, for the most part, came from the lands of the estate.  Lumber was obtained from the forested areas of the property.  Depending on its intended use, it was either split, hewn, or sawn.  Bricks were most often produced onsite from sand and clay that was molded, dried, and then fired in a kiln. If a suitable stone was available, it was used. Tabby was often used on the southern Sea Islands.

Few plantation structures have survived into the modern era, with the vast majority destroyed through natural disaster, neglect, or fire over the centuries.  With the collapse of the plantation economy and subsequent Southern transition from a largely agrarian to an industrial society, plantations and their building complexes became obsolete.  Although the majority have been destroyed, the most common structures to have survived are the plantation houses. As is true of buildings in general, the more substantially built and architecturally interesting buildings have tended to be the ones that survived into the modern age and are better documented than many of the smaller and simpler ones. Several plantation homes of important persons, including Mount Vernon, Monticello, and The Hermitage have also been preserved.  Less common are intact examples of slave housing.  The rarest survivors of all are the agricultural and lesser domestic structures, especially those dating from the pre-Civil War era.

Slave quarters

Slave housing, although once one of the most common and distinctive features of the plantation landscape, has largely disappeared from most of the South.  Many were insubstantial to begin with.  Only the better-built examples tended to survive, and then usually only if they were turned to other uses after emancipation.  Slave quarters could be next to the main house, well away from it, or both.  On large plantations they were often arranged in a village-like grouping along an avenue away from the main house, but sometimes were scattered around the plantation on the edges of the fields where the enslaved people toiled, like most of the sharecropper cabins that were to come later.

Slave houses were often one of the most basic construction.  Meant for little more than sleeping, they were usually rough log or frame one-room cabins; early examples often had chimneys made of clay and sticks.  Hall and parlor houses (two rooms) were also represented on the plantation landscape, offering a separate room for eating and sleeping. Sometimes dormitories and two-story dwellings were also used as slave housing. Earlier examples rested on the ground with a dirt floor, but later examples were usually raised on piers for ventilation. Most of these represent the dwellings constructed for field slaves. Rarely though, such as at the former Hermitage Plantation in Georgia and Boone Hall in South Carolina, even field slaves were provided with brick cabins.

More fortunate in their accommodations were the house servants or skilled laborers.  They usually resided either in a part of the main house or in their own houses, which were normally more comfortable dwellings than those of their counterparts who worked in the fields.  A few enslavers went even further to provide housing for their household servants.  When Waldwic in Alabama was remodeled in the Gothic Revival style in the 1852, the household servants were provided with large accommodations that matched the architecture of the main house.  This model, however, was exceedingly rare.

Famous landscape designer Frederick Law Olmsted had this recollection of a visit to plantations along the Georgia coast in 1855:

Other residential structures

A crucial residential structure on larger plantations was an overseer's house.  The overseer was largely responsible for the success or failure of an estate, making sure that quotas were met and sometimes meting out punishment for infractions by the enslaved. The overseer was responsible for healthcare, with enslaved people and slave houses inspected routinely. He was also the record keeper of most crop inventories and held the keys to various storehouses.

The overseer's house was usually a modest dwelling, not far from the cabins of the enslaved workers. The overseer and his family, even when white and southern, did not freely mingle with the planter and his family.  They were in a different social stratum than that of the owner and were expected to know their place. In village-type slave quarters on plantations with overseers, his house was usually at the head of the slave village rather than near the main house, at least partially due to his social position. It was also part of an effort to keep the enslaved people compliant and prevent the beginnings of a slave rebellion, a very real fear in the minds of most plantation owners.

Economic studies indicate that fewer than 30 percent of planters employed white supervisors for their slave labor. Some planters appointed a trusted slave as the overseer, and in Louisiana free black overseers were also used.

Another residential structure largely unique to plantation complexes was the garconnière or bachelors' quarters.  Mostly built by Louisiana Creole people, but occasionally found in other parts of the Deep South formerly under the dominion of New France, they were structures that housed the adolescent or unmarried sons of plantation owners.  At some plantations it was a free-standing structure and at others it was attached to the main house by side-wings. It developed from the Acadian tradition of using the loft of the house as a bedroom for young men.

Kitchen yard

A variety of domestic and lesser agricultural structures surrounded the main house on all plantations. Most plantations possessed some, if not all, of these outbuildings, often called dependencies, commonly arranged around a courtyard to the rear of the main house known as the kitchen yard. They included a cookhouse (separate kitchen building), pantry, washhouse (laundry), smokehouse, chicken house, spring house or ice house, milkhouse (dairy), covered well, and cistern.  The privies would have been located some distance away from the plantation house and kitchen yard.

The cookhouse or kitchen was almost always in a separate building in the South until modern times, sometimes connected to the main house by a covered walkway.  This separation was partially due to the cooking fire generating heat all day long in an already hot and humid climate.  It also reduced the risk of fire. Indeed, on many plantations the cookhouse was built of brick while when the main house was of wood-frame construction.  Another reason for the separation was to prevent the noise and smells of cooking activities from reaching the main house.  Sometimes the cookhouse contained two rooms, one for the actual kitchen and the other to serve as the residence for the cook.  Still other arrangements had the kitchen in one room, a laundry in the other, and a second story for servant quarters. The pantry could be in its own structure or in a cool part of the cookhouse or a storehouse and would have secured items such as barrels of salt, sugar, flour, cornmeal and the like.

The washhouse is where clothes, tablecloths, and bed-covers were cleaned and ironed. It also sometimes had living quarters for the laundrywoman. Cleaning laundry in this period was labor-intensive for the domestic slaves that performed it. It required various gadgets to accomplish the task. The wash boiler was a cast iron or copper cauldron in which clothes or other fabrics and soapy water were heated over an open fire. The wash-stick was a wooden stick with a handle at its uppermost part and four to five prongs at its base. It was simultaneously pounded up and down and rotated in the washing tub to aerate the wash solution and loosen any dirt. The items would then be vigorously rubbed on a corrugated wash board until clean. By the 1850s, they would have been passed through a mangle. Prior to that time, wringing out the items was done by hand. The items would then be ready to be hung out to dry or, in inclement weather, placed on a drying rack. Ironing would have been done with a metal flat iron, often heated in the fireplace, and various other devices.

The milkhouse would have been used by enslaved people to make milk into cream, butter, and buttermilk. The process started with separating the milk into skim milk and cream. It was done by pouring the whole milk into a container and allowing the cream to naturally rise to the top. This was collected into another container daily until several gallons had accumulated. During this time the cream would sour slightly through naturally occurring bacteria. This increased the efficiency of the churning to come. Churning was an arduous task performed with a butter churn. Once firm enough to separate out, but soft enough to stick together, the butter was taken out of the churn, washed in very cold water, and salted. The churning process also produced buttermilk as a by-product. It was the remaining liquid after the butter was removed from the churn. All of the products of this process would have been stored in the spring house or ice house.

The smokehouse was utilized to preserve meat, usually pork, beef, and mutton. It was commonly built of hewn logs or brick.  Following the slaughter in the fall or early winter, salt and sugar were applied to the meat at the beginning of the curing process, and then the meat was slowly dried and smoked in the smokehouse by a fire that did not add any heat to the smokehouse itself. If it was cool enough, the meat could also be stored there until it was consumed.

The chicken house was a building where chickens were kept. Its design could vary, depending on whether the chickens were kept for egg production, meat, or both. If for eggs, there were often nest boxes for egg laying and perches on which the birds to sleep.  Eggs were collected daily.  Some plantations also had pigeonniers (dovecotes) that, in Louisiana, sometimes took the form of monumental towers set near the main house. The pigeons were raised to be eaten as a delicacy and their droppings were used as fertilizer.

Few functions could take place on a plantation without a reliable water supply.  Every plantation had at least one, and sometimes several, wells. These were usually roofed and often partially enclosed by latticework to exclude animals. Since the well water in many areas was distasteful due to mineral content, the potable water on many plantations came from cisterns that were supplied with rainwater by a pipe from a rooftop catchment. These could be huge aboveground wooden barrels capped by metal domes, such as was often seen in Louisiana and coastal areas of Mississippi, or underground brick masonry domes or vaults, common in other areas.

Ancillary structures

Some structures on plantations provided subsidiary functions; again, the term dependency can be applied to these buildings.  A few were common, such as the carriage house and blacksmith shop; but most varied widely among plantations and were largely a function of what the planter wanted, needed, or could afford to add to the complex. These buildings might include schoolhouses, offices, churches, commissary stores, gristmills, and sawmills.

Found on some plantations in every Southern state, plantation schoolhouses served as a place for the hired tutor or governess to educate the planter's children, and sometimes even those of other planters in the area.  On most plantations, however, a room in the main house was sufficient for schooling, rather than a separate dedicated building.  Paper was precious, so the children often recited their lessons until they memorized them.  The usual texts in the beginning were the Bible, a primer, and a hornbook. As the children grew older their schooling began to prepare them for their adult roles on the plantation. Boys studied academic subjects, proper social etiquette, and plantation management, while girls learned art, music, French, and the domestic skills suited to the mistress of a plantation.

Most plantation owners maintained an office for keeping records, transacting business, writing correspondence, and the like.  Although it, like the schoolroom, was most often within the main house or another structure, it was not at all rare for a complex to have a separate plantation office. John C. Calhoun used his plantation office at his Fort Hill plantation in Clemson, South Carolina as a private sanctuary of sorts, with it utilized as both study and library during his twenty-five year residency.

Another structure found on some estates was a plantation chapel or church.  These were built for a variety of reasons.  In many cases the planter built a church or chapel for the use of the plantation slaves, although they usually recruited a white minister to conduct the services.  Some were built to exclusively serve the plantation family, but many more were built to serve the family and others in the area who shared the same faith.  This seems to be especially true with planters within the Episcopal denomination. Early records indicate that at Faunsdale Plantation the mistress of the estate, Louisa Harrison, gave regular instruction to her slaves by reading the services of the church and teaching the Episcopal catechism to their children.  Following the death of her first husband, she had a large Carpenter Gothic church built, St. Michael's Church.  She latter remarried to Rev. William A. Stickney, who served as the Episcopal minister of St. Michael's and was later appointed by Bishop Richard Wilmer as a "Missionary to the Negroes," after which Louisa joined him as an unofficial fellow minister among the African Americans of the Black Belt.

Most plantation churches were of wood-frame construction, although some were built in brick, often stuccoed.  Early examples tended towards the vernacular or neoclassicism, but later examples were almost always in the Gothic Revival style.  A few rivaled those built by southern town congregations.  Two of the most elaborate extant examples in the Deep South are the Chapel of the Cross at Annandale Plantation and St. Mary's Chapel at Laurel Hill Plantation, both Episcopalian structures in Mississippi.  In both cases the original plantation houses have been destroyed, but the quality and design of the churches can give some insight into how elaborate some plantation complexes and their buildings could be.  St. Mary Chapel, in Natchez, dates to 1839, built in stuccoed brick with large Gothic and Tudor arch windows, hood mouldings over the doors and windows, buttresses, a crenelated roof-line, and a small Gothic spire crowning the whole.  Although construction records are very sketchy, the Chapel of the Cross, built from 1850 to 1852 near Madison, may be attributable to Frank Wills or Richard Upjohn, both of whom designed almost identical churches in the North during the same time period that the Chapel of the Cross was built.

Another secondary structure on many plantations during the height of the sharecropping-era was the plantation store or commissary.  Although some antebellum plantations had a commissary that distributed food and supplies to enslaved people, the plantation store was essentially a postbellum addition to the plantation complex.  In addition to the share of their crop already owed to the plantation owner for the use of his or her land, tenants and sharecroppers purchased, usually on credit against their next crop, the food staples and equipment that they relied on for their existence.

This type of debt bondage, for blacks and poor whites, led to a populist movement in the late 19th century that began to bring blacks and whites together for a common cause. This early populist movement is largely credited with helping to cause state governments in the South, mostly controlled by the planter elite, to enact various laws that disenfranchised poor whites and blacks, through grandfather clauses, literacy tests, poll taxes, and various other laws.

Agricultural structures

The agricultural structures on plantations had some basic structures in common and others that varied widely.  They depended on what crops and animals were raised on the plantation.  Common crops included corn, upland cotton, sea island cotton, rice, sugarcane, and tobacco.  Besides those mentioned earlier, cattle, ducks, goats, hogs, and sheep were raised for their derived products and/or meat. All estates would have possessed various types of animal pens, stables, and a variety of barns.  Many plantations utilized a number of specialized structures that were crop-specific and only found on that type of plantation.

Plantation barns can be classified by function, depending on what type of crop and livestock were raised.  In the upper South, like their counterparts in the North, barns had to provide basic shelter for the animals and storage of fodder.  Unlike the upper regions, most plantations in the lower South did not have to provide substantial shelter to their animals during the winter.  Animals were often kept in fattening pens with a simple shed for shelter, with the main barn or barns being utilized for crop storage or processing only.  Stables were an essential type of barn on the plantation, used to house both horses and mules.  These were usually separate, one for each type of animal.  The mule stable was the most important on the vast majority of estates, since the mules did most of the work, pulling the plows and carts.

Barns not involved in animal husbandry were most commonly the crib barn (corn cribs or other types of granaries), storage barns, or processing barns. Crib barns were typically built of unchinked logs, although they were sometimes covered with vertical wood siding.  Storage barns often housed unprocessed crops or those awaiting consumption or transport to market. Processing barns were specialized structures that were necessary for helping to actually process the crop.

Tobacco plantations were most common in certain parts of Georgia, Kentucky, Missouri, North Carolina, Tennessee, South Carolina, and Virginia.  The first agricultural plantations in Virginia were founded on the growing of tobacco.  Tobacco production on plantations was very labor-intensive.  It required the entire year to gather seeds, start them growing in cold frames, and then transplant the plants to the fields once the soil had warmed.  Then the enslaved people had to weed the fields all summer and remove the flowers from the tobacco plants in order to force more energy into the leaves. Harvesting was done by plucking individual leaves over several weeks as they ripened, or cutting entire tobacco plants and hanging them in vented tobacco barns to dry, called curing.

Rice plantations were common in the South Carolina Lowcountry. Until the 19th century, rice was threshed from the stalks and the husk was pounded from the grain by hand, a very labor-intensive endeavor. Steam-powered rice pounding mills had become common by the 1830s.  They were used to thresh the grain from the inedible chaff.  A separate chimney, required for the fires powering the steam engine, was adjacent to the pounding mill and often connected by an underground system. The winnowing barn, a building raised roughly a story off of the ground on posts, was used to separate the lighter chaff and dust from the rice.

Sugar plantations were most commonly found in Louisiana.  In fact, Louisiana produced almost all of the sugar grown in the United States during the antebellum period. From one-quarter to one-half of all sugar consumed in the United States came from Louisiana sugar plantations.  Plantations grew sugarcane from Louisiana's colonial era onward, but large scale production did not begin until the 1810s and 1820s.  A successful sugar plantation required a skilled retinue of hired labor and enslaved people.

The most specialized structure on a sugar plantation was the sugar mill (sugar house), where, by the 1830s, the steam-powered mill crushed the sugarcane stalks between rollers.  This squeezed the juice from the stalks and the cane juice would run out the bottom of the mill through a strainer to be collected into a tank.  From there the juice went through a process that removed impurities from the liquid and thickened it through evaporation.  It was steam-heated in vats where additional impurities were removed by adding lime to the syrup and then the mixture was strained. At this point the liquid had been transformed into molasses.  It was then placed into a closed vessel known as a vacuum pan, where it was boiled until the sugar in the syrup was crystallized.  The crystallized sugar was then cooled and separated from any remaining molasses in a process known as purging.  The final step was packing the sugar into hogshead barrels for transport to market.

Cotton plantations, the most common type of plantation in the South prior to the Civil War, were the last type of plantation to fully develop.  Cotton production was a very labor-intensive crop to harvest, with the fibers having to be hand-picked from the bolls. This was coupled with the equally laborious removal of seeds from fiber by hand.

Following the invention of the cotton gin, cotton plantations sprang up all over the South and cotton production soared, along with the expansion of slavery.  Cotton also caused plantations to grow in size. During the financial panics of 1819 and 1837, when demand by British mills for cotton dropped, many small planters went bankrupt and their land and slaves were bought by larger plantations. As cotton-producing estates grew in size, so did the number of slaveholders and the average number of enslaved people held.

A cotton plantation normally had a cotton gin house, where the cotton gin was used to remove the seeds from raw cotton.  After ginning, the cotton had to be baled before it could be warehoused and transported to market.  This was accomplished with a cotton press, an early type of baler that was usually powered by two mules walking in a circle with each attached to an overhead arm that turned a huge wooden screw.  The downward action of this screw compressed the processed cotton into a uniform bale-shaped wooden enclosure, where the bale was secured with twine.

Plantation complexes in the 21st century

Many manor houses survive, and in some cases former slave dwellings have been rebuilt or renovated. To pay for the upkeep, some, like the Monmouth Plantation in Natchez, Mississippi and the Lipscomb Plantation in Durham, North Carolina, have become small luxury hotels or bed and breakfasts. Not only Monticello and Mount Vernon but some 375 former plantation houses are museums that can be visited. There are examples in every Southern state. Centers of plantation life such as Natchez run plantation tours. Traditionally the museum houses presented an idyllic, dignified "lost cause" vision of the antebellum South. Recently, and to different degrees, some have begun to acknowledge the "horrors of slavery" which made that life possible.

In late 2019, after contact initiated by Color of Change, "five major websites often used for wedding planning have pledged to cut back on promoting and romanticizing weddings at former slave plantations". The New York Times, earlier in 2019, "decided...to exclude couples who were being married on plantations from wedding announcements and other wedding coverage".

Personnel

Plantation owner

An individual who owned a plantation was known as a planter. Historians of the antebellum South have generally defined "planter" most precisely as a person owning property (real estate) and 20 or more slaves. In the "Black Belt" counties of Alabama and Mississippi, the terms "planter" and "farmer" were often synonymous.

The historians Robert Fogel and Stanley Engerman define large planters as those owning over 50 enslaved people, and medium planters as those owning between 16 and 50 enslaved people. Historian David Williams, in A People's History of the Civil War: Struggles for the Meaning of Freedom, suggests that the minimum requirement for planter status was twenty slaves, especially since a Southern planter could exempt Confederate duty for one white male per twenty slaves owned. In his study of Black Belt counties in Alabama, Jonathan Weiner defines planters by ownership of real property, rather than of slaves. A planter, for Weiner, owned at least $10,000 worth of real estate in 1850 and $32,000 worth in 1860, equivalent to about the top eight percent of landowners. In his study of southwest Georgia, Lee Formwalt defines planters in terms of size of land holdings rather than in terms of numbers of slaves. Formwalt's planters are in the top 4.5% of landowners, translating into real estate worth $6,000 or more in 1850, $24,000 or more in 1860, and $11,000 or more in 1870. In his study of Harrison County, Texas, Randolph B. Campbell classifies large planters as owners of 20 slaves, and small planters as owners of between 10 and 19 slaves.

Many nostalgic memoirs about plantation life were published in the post-bellum South. For example, James Battle Avirett, who grew up on the Avirett-Stephens Plantation in Onslow County, North Carolina, and served as an Episcopal chaplain in the Confederate States Army, published The Old Plantation: How We Lived in Great House and Cabin before the War in 1901. Such memoirs often included descriptions of Christmas as the epitome of anti-modern order exemplified by the "great house" and extended family.

Novels, often adapted into films, presented a romantic, sanitized view of plantation life. The most popular of these were The Birth of a Nation (1916), based on Thomas Dixon Jr.,'s best-selling novel The Clansman (1905), and Gone with the Wind (1939), based on the best-selling novel of the same name (1936) by Margaret Mitchell.

Overseer
On larger plantations an overseer represented the planter in matters of daily management. Usually perceived as uncouth, ill-educated, and low-class, he had the often despised task of meting out punishments in order to keep up discipline and secure the profit of his employer.

Slavery

Southern plantations depended upon slaves to do the agricultural work. "Honestly, 'plantation' and 'slavery' is one and the same," said an employee of the Whitney Plantation in 2019.

"Many plantations, including George Washington's Mount Vernon and Thomas Jefferson's Monticello, are working to present a more accurate image of what life was like for slaves and slave owners." "The changes have begun to draw people long alienated by the sites' whitewashing of the past and to satisfy what staff call a hunger for real history, as plantations add slavery-focused tours, rebuild cabins and reconstruct the lives of the enslaved with help from their descendants."

McLeod Plantation focuses primarily on slavery. "McLeod focuses on bondage, talking bluntly about “slave labor camps” and shunning the big white house for the fields." "'I was depressed by the time I left and questioned why anyone would want to live in South Carolina,' read one review [of a tour] posted to Twitter."

See also

African-American history
American gentry
Atlantic slave trade
Casa-Grande & Senzala (similar concept in Brazilian plantations)
History of the Southern United States
Journal of a Residence on a Georgian Plantation in 1838–1839
List of plantations in the United States
Lost Cause of the Confederacy
Plain Folk of the Old South (1949 book by historian Frank Lawrence Owsley)
Plantation-era songs
Plantation tradition (genre of literature)
Plantations of Leon County (Florida)
Planter class
Sharecropping in the United States 
Slavery at Tuckahoe plantation
Slavery in the United States
Treatment of slaves in the United States
White supremacy

References

Further reading

Blassingame, John W. The Slave Community: Plantation Life in the Antebellum South (1979)
 * Evans, Chris, "The Plantation Hoe: The Rise and Fall of an Atlantic Commodity, 1650–1850," William and Mary Quarterly, (2012) 69#1 pp 71–100.
 Phillips, Ulrich B.  American Negro Slavery; a Survey of the Supply, Employment, and Control of Negro Labor, as Determined by the Plantation Regime. (1918; reprint 1966)online at Project Gutenberg; google edition
 Phillips, Ulrich B.  Life and Labor in the Old South. (1929).  excerpts and text search
 Phillips, Ulrich B. 
 Silkenat, David. Scars on the Land: An Environmental History of Slavery in the American South. New York: Oxford University Press, 2022.
 Thompson, Edgar Tristram. The Plantation  edited by Sidney Mintz and George Baca (University of South Carolina Press; 2011) 176 pages; 1933 dissertation
  Weiner, Marli Frances. Mistresses and Slaves: Plantation Women in South Carolina, 1830-80 (1997)
 White, Deborah G. Aren't I a Woman?: Female Slaves in the Plantation South (2nd ed. 1999) excerpt and text search
 
 Phillips, Ulrich B., ed.  Plantation and Frontier Documents, 1649–1863; Illustrative of Industrial History in the Colonial and Antebellum South: Collected from MSS. and Other Rare Sources. 2 Volumes. (1909). online edition
 

 
 
History of the Southern United States
History of agriculture in the United States
 
 
Pre-emancipation African-American history